Strezhevoy is a town in Tomsk Oblast, Russia, located on the shores of the Ob River's canal. Population:

History
It was founded in 1966 as a settlement near the village of Strezhevoy and was granted town status in 1978.

Administrative and municipal status
Within the framework of administrative divisions, it is incorporated as Strezhevoy Town Under Oblast Jurisdiction—an administrative unit with the status equal to that of the districts. As a municipal division, Strezhevoy Town Under Oblast Jurisdiction is incorporated as Strezhevoy Urban Okrug.

Economy and infrastructure
Joint-stock company Tomskneft, a Tomsk-based oil production company controlled by Rosneft, is located in Strezhevoy, and the town grew up around the company's expanding needs. Most of the town's housing and all of its major public amenities were constructed around the company's needs in the 1960s and 1970s.

Transportation
It is served by the Strezhevoy Airport.

References

Notes

Sources

Cities and towns in Tomsk Oblast
Cities and towns built in the Soviet Union
Populated places established in 1966
Populated places on the Ob River